Laura Brosius (born 8 January 1990 in Berlin) is a German football defender. She currently plays for FF USV Jena.

Football career 
Brosius began her career at SG Bornim. She joined the academy of 1. FFC Turbine Potsdam in 2002. In 2005 and 2006, she won the German girls championship. She then joined the reserve team and played in the second division. Only in the 2007–08 season she acquired 11 caps for the first team. In June 2010 she announced her transfer to FF USV Jena.

Running career 
Outside of football, Brosius has participated in endurance running events.

References

External links 
 Official homepage of 1. FFC Turbine Potsdam

1990 births
Living people
German women's footballers
1. FFC Turbine Potsdam players
FF USV Jena players
Footballers from Berlin
Women's association football defenders